Sherman Township is one of ten townships in Leavenworth County, Kansas, United States.  As of the 2010 census, its population was 2,657. Sherman contains two cities, Linwood and De Soto.

Cities

Incorporated Cities
Linwood
De Soto (partly in Johnson County)

Unincorporated Cities
 Lenape
 Loring
(This list is based on USGS data and may include former settlements.)

Adjacent Townships
 Stranger Township in Leavenworth County (north)
 Delaware Township in Wyandotte County (east)
 Lexington Township in Johnson County (south)
 Eudora Township in Douglas County (southwest)

Cemeteries
The township contains one cemetery: 
Chance Cemetery, Linwood

Transportation

Major highways

Airports and landing strips
 Ingels Aerodrome, De Soto
 Huff Airstrip, Bonner Springs

Emergency Services
 Sherman Township Fire & EMS

School districts
 Basehor-Linwood USD 458
 Tonganoxie USD 464
 Bonner Springs–Edwardsville USD 204
 De Soto USD 232

External links

Townships in Leavenworth County, Kansas
Townships in Kansas